A "Red Scare" is the promotion of a widespread fear of a potential rise of communism or anarchism by a society or state. It may also refer to:

 Red Scare (podcast), a cultural commentary podcast
 Red Scare Industries, a punk rock record label
 Red Scare (comics), a character in the comic book series The Tick

See also
 Red Terror